The 2010 ADAC Formel Masters season was the third season of the ADAC Formel Masters series from Germany. Richie Stanaway won twelve of the first 18 races en route to claiming championship victory with a meeting to spare. His team ma-con Motorsport also claimed the teams' championship at the Nürburgring round of the series. German drivers Patrick Schranner and Mario Farnbacher finished second and third in the points.

Teams and drivers

Race calendar and results
 The number of races will increase from 16 to 21, with a triple-race format at each round. That said, the number of rounds will drop from eight to seven. Each race weekend will be a part of the ADAC's Masters Weekend package.

Championship standings

Drivers' Championship

Teams' Championship

References

External links
 Official Website 
 ADAC Masters Weekend 

ADAC Formel Masters
ADAC Formel Masters seasons
ADAC Formel Masters